"Heartbroken Bopper" is a popular rock song written by Burton Cummings and Kurt Winter.

The song was recorded by the Canadian rock group The Guess Who for the album Rockin' and is also included on the 1974 album The Best of the Guess Who, Vol. 2.

Chart performance
The single release spent seven weeks on the Billboard charts peaking at #47 on the Billboard Hot 100 during the week of April 8, 1972.  The song reached #12 in Canada and #83 in Australia.

References

Songs about heartache
1972 songs
1972 singles
Songs written by Burton Cummings
Songs written by Kurt Winter
The Guess Who songs
Song recordings produced by Jack Richardson (record producer)
RCA Victor singles